Pankasz is a village in Vas county, Hungary.

External links 
 Street map (Hungarian)

Populated places in Vas County